Jef Lahaye (2 December 1932 – 12 April 1990) was a Dutch professional racing cyclist. He rode in three editions of the Tour de France.

References

External links
 

1932 births
1990 deaths
Dutch male cyclists
People from Bunde
Cyclists from Limburg (Netherlands)